Giuseppe Riccobaldi del Bava (4 July 1887 – 21 April 1976) was an Italian painter. His work was part of the painting event in the art competition at the 1948 Summer Olympics.  He is most noted for his work on travel, marketing and industrial posters.

References

External links
 

1887 births
1976 deaths
20th-century Italian painters
Italian male painters
Olympic competitors in art competitions
Painters from Florence
Italian Futurist painters
20th-century Italian male artists